Emmanuel Church, Bentley is a parish church in the Church of England in Bentley, West Midlands.

History

The church was started in 1954 by the architect Richard Twentyman with Lavender and Percy and consecrated in 1956 by Rt. Revd. Stretton Reeve the Bishop of Lichfield. It was built in memory of Alfred Ernest Owen. It was built of brick over a concrete frame. The bell tower is punctuated by asymmetrical openings. The chancel and sanctuary are lit with strongly vertical windows.

The building received praise from Pevsner who describes it as more accommodating and much prettier than their pre-war work.  It was listed at Grade II by Historic England in March 2016.

Organ

The church is equipped with a pipe organ by Hawkins dating from 1956. A specification of the organ can be found on the National Pipe Organ Register.

References

Church of England church buildings in the West Midlands (county)
Churches completed in 1956
Richard Twentyman